Pugin & Pugin (fl. 1851–c. 1958) was a London-based family firm of church architects.

History
The firm was founded with the Westminster office of Augustus Welby Northmore Pugin (1812–1852). Augustus Pugin was succeeded by his sons Cuthbert Welby Pugin (1840–1928) and Peter Paul Pugin (1851–1904) after the death of their elder brother, Edward Welby Pugin (1834–1875). They were later joined by Sebastian Pugin Powell and Charles Henry Cuthbert Purcell until the latter's death in 1958.

Buildings
The firm worked exclusively in the Gothic Revival style, and produced many buildings, alterations and furnishings for the Roman Catholic Church, such as the sanctuary of the Sacred Heart Church, Liverpool, Sacred Heart Church, Kilburn, English Martyrs Church, Tower Hill, St Mary's Church, Morecambe and the presbytery of the Sacred Heart Church in Bridgeton, Glasgow, and St Mary's Church in Stirling.

The firm designed the high altar of the church of St John Cantius and St Nicholas Catholic Church in Broxburn, West Lothian in caen stone and marble. 

There are reputedly about a hundred buildings by the firm in Australasia, built from the mid-1850s onwards, for the Roman Catholic Church. All but one are in Australia, the singular example in New Zealand is the 1890s Bishop's Palace in Saint Mary's Bay, Auckland, commissioned by Bishop Luck. Dom John Edmund Lock OSB (1840-1896) was a monk of St Augustine's in Ramsgate, Kent, England. The monastery was built by Edward Welby Pugin in 1861, across the road from the church designed by A W Pugin, and funded by the Rev Alfred Lock, John's father.  John Lock joined the novitiate in that same year and became 4th Bishop of Auckland in 1882.

References

External links 
 Pugin & Pugin, Short Biography
 The Churches of EW and PP Pugin

Architecture firms based in London
Companies established in 1851
Architects of Roman Catholic churches
1851 establishments in England